Rushe is a surname. Notable people with the surname include:

Anthony Rushe (d. 1577), British cannon
David Rushe (1827–1886), British Army sergeant-major
James Carrige Rushe Lardner (1879–1925), Irish politician
Liam Rushe (born 1990), Irish hurler
Padraig Rushe (born 1982), Irish businessman